The Geul is a river in Belgium and in the Netherlands, where it is a right-bank tributary to the river Meuse.

Geography 
After a further  in a west-northwestern direction through the southernmost part of Limburg, which in its turn is the most southern province of the Netherlands, it flows into the Meuse, north of the city of Maastricht.

A tributary of the Geul is the Gulp.

Places through which the Geul passes are among others Kelmis (Belgium), Valkenburg aan de Geul and Meerssen (Netherlands).

Pollution
The water of the Geul is polluted seriously with heavy metals zinc and lead and as a result also is a serious source of heavy metal inflow into the Meuse.

This pollution is a result of former zinc and lead mining activities near the Belgian towns of Kelmis (La Calamine) and Plombières (formerly named Bleiberg).

The last one of these mines have closed early in the 20th century. One of the reasons for giving up mining activities in Plombières was the occasional flooding of the mine by the Geul, as the bedrock (mainly Carboniferous limestone) contains many faults and fissures.

Although mine factory buildings have been demolished, old railway dikes still are abundantly present in the area. They provide ideal hiking routes, that are known for the presence of so-called "zinc flora" (zinc-tolerant plants, such as yellow calamine violet and  Viola calaminaria).

Significant events 

During the 2021 European floods, the banks of the river flooded, including in some of the major  population centers such as Valkenburg aan de Geul.

Gallery

References

International rivers of Europe
Rivers of the Ardennes (Belgium)
Rivers of Belgium
Rivers of the Netherlands
Rivers of Liège Province
Rivers of South Limburg (Netherlands)
Gulpen-Wittem
Kelmis
Meerssen
Plombières
Raeren
Valkenburg aan de Geul